Vittatopothyne flavovittata is a species of beetle in the family Cerambycidae, and the only species in the genus Vittatopothyne. It was described by Stephan von Breuning in 1960.

References

Agapanthiini
Beetles described in 1960
Monotypic beetle genera